"Road" is a song performed by South Korean boy band g.o.d. It was the title track of their fourth album Chapter 4, which was released in November 2001 and became their second "million"-selling album. In a 2006 poll conducted by Gallup Korea, 1,500 Koreans aged 13 and above listed their five favorite songs and "Road" was ranked 59th out of the top 100 songs named.

Overview
The lyrics and music were composed by Park Jin-young. At that time, the group was not managed by his company JYP Entertainment but he worked closely with them as a producer and songwriter. The accompanying soundtrack was also included in the album and was arranged by composer and music producer Bang Si-hyuk, who went on to establish Big Hit Entertainment. According to g.o.d lead vocalist Kim Tae-woo, the song was conceived during a period of uncertainty about their futures, following the massive success of their million-selling third album and its lead track "Lies".

The song speaks of a person being unsure of which "road" to take in life and comprises a series of first-person questions pondering about what one values in life and the uncertainty of the path chosen.

Accolades
Upon the release of Chapter 4, "Road" became one of g.o.d's most popular and critically acclaimed songs. It received 7 music program awards, including a "Triple Crown" on SBS's Inkigayo (old ranking system), topping the ranking for three weeks in a row, and dominated the #1 rankings for the month of December on MBC's Music Camp (the former incarnation of Show! Music Core). The song also garnered critical acclaim as it was awarded the Daesang (Grand Prize) (Grand Prize) by all three major broadcasting stations in South Korea – KBS, MBC and SBS – at their respective year-end music awards ceremonies, making g.o.d one of the few groups to have been so honored. The album itself also won the "Album of the Year" (Daesang (Grand Prize)) at the 16th Golden Disc Awards, one of the industry's most prestigious awards ceremonies.

2019 remake

The song was featured in the group's 20th anniversary album Then & Now as one of six songs from previous albums to be remixed and re-recorded. The instrumental track for the new version was arranged by Jeong Dong-hwan of MeloMance. Compared to the simple groove of the original, the new version features a more layered and grander texture. g.o.d do not feature at all and are replaced by solo artists IU and Yang Da-il, former Super Junior-M member Henry and Jo Hyun-ah of indie R&B trio Urban Zakapa.

This version was one of several songs from the album which charted. It debuted at #64 in the Gaon Digital Chart before peaking at #14 the following week. It reached #21 on the monthly chart for January.

Notable cover versions
"Road" has been covered numerous times on various singing competitions and music variety shows. Recent idol groups that have covered the song include B1A4 during a special segment at the 28th Golden Disc Awards honoring past winners.

Lee Jin-ah (K-pop Star season 4)
Henry on Mnet's Sing Again, Hera Gu episode 10 (mash-up with "Lies" by g.o.d)
Sandeul & Jo Seon-young (winner of Duet Song Festival episode 5)
Kim Tae-woo & "Wolmi-do Little Giant" Park Joo-hyun (winner of Fantastic Duo season 1 episodes 11–12)
Goo Jeong-hyun ft. Kim Tae-woo and Son Ho-young (winner of I Can See Your Voice season 3 episode 10)
Henry, Jung Seung-hwan, Lee Su-Hyun, and Sohyang (Begin Again season 4 episode 8)

In popular culture
MBC's partner news portal mbig created a satirical lyric music video using news footage of Kim Jong-un on the journey to Vietnam for the summit and during the meeting with United States President Donald Trump. The original 2001 version was used.

References

External links
Track Information — Mnet 
Music Video: G.O.D - Road / Gil MV HD (지오디 - 길 뮤직비디오 HD) on YouTube (GrooveOverDoseTV)

G.o.d songs
2001 singles
2001 songs
Korean-language songs
Songs written by Park Jin-young